The Luisenthal Mine was a coal mine near Völklingen. The mine was known as the site of the largest mine accident in the history of the German Federal Republic, when 299 miners died on 7 February 1962.

1962 mine disaster

On 7 February 1962 a methane explosion occurred after the opening of a methane-containing cavern in the Alsbach field. This triggered a larger coal dust explosion with devastating effects. 284 workers were killed, making this the greatest mining catastrophe in the history of the Saarland coal mining area.

See also 

 Luisenthal Formation

References

1962 in Germany
Buildings and structures in Saarbrücken (district)
Economy of Saarland
Mining disasters in Germany
1962 disasters in Germany
Coal mines in Germany
Coal mining disasters in Germany
Underground mines in Germany